The 1976 Notre Dame Fighting Irish football team represented the University of Notre Dame during the 1976 NCAA Division I football season.

Schedule

Personnel

Season summary

Pittsburgh

Purdue

at Northwestern

at Michigan State

Oregon

at South Carolina

vs. Navy

at Georgia Tech

Alabama

Miami (FL)

at USC

Rick Slager started the game but was replaced by Rusty Lisch after Slagler injured his shoulder.

Gator Bowl (vs Penn State)

References

Notre Dame
Notre Dame Fighting Irish football seasons
Gator Bowl champion seasons
Notre Dame Fighting Irish football